Walnut Township, Indiana may refer to one of the following places:

 Walnut Township, Marshall County, Indiana
 Walnut Township, Montgomery County, Indiana

See also

Walnut Township (disambiguation)

Indiana township disambiguation pages